In Ovid's Metamorphoses, Phobetor was a god who appeared in dreams in the form of beasts, 

Phobetor may also refer to:

 Phobetor, a genus of pterosaur now classified as Noripterus
 Phobetor (planet) or PSR 1257+12 d, an exoplanet